Ahmad bin Muhammad bin al-Siddiq al-Ghumari was a Muslim traditionist and scholar of Hadith from Morocco.

Career
Ghumari authored more than one hundred books. He was well known for a debate which acrimoniously began between him and fellow hadith scholar Muhammad Nasiruddin al-Albani, and later continued with Ghumari's younger brother Abdullah and Albani. 

Like the rest of his family, Ghumari was a leader of the Siddiqiyya Sufi order. Muhammad Taqi-ud-Din al-Hilali claimed that al-Ghumari had chosen to live a very simple life and eschewed material excess.

Views
Although a practitioner of Sufism, Ghumari criticized some Sufis, especially the rival Naqshbandi order. Like Ibn Hazm, Ghumari viewed scholarly differences of opinion as wrong and he often used harsh language when responding to intellectual opponents. Having originally followed the Maliki school of thought like most of Muslim scholarship in Morocco, al-Ghumari later switched to the Shafi'i school for a period and finally opted for absolute independent reasoning. Unlike most of Moroccan scholarship, al-Ghumari opposed the Ash'ari school of theology. Muhammad Abu Khubza, among other Moroccan scholars, also claim that al-Ghumari temporarily adhered to the Zaidiyyah school of Shia Islam.

Works
 Tabyin al-balah mimman ankara wujud hadith Wa-man lagha fa-la jumu'ah lahu. Dar al-Basa`ir, 1982.

Citations

External links
 Avoid Imitating the Kuffar by Ahmad bin al-Siddiq al-Ghumari
 Arabic Online Biography of the Ibn al-Siddiq family

Shafi'is
Hadith scholars
Sunni Sufis
Critics of Ibn Taymiyya
Critics of Wahhabism
20th-century imams
Jurisprudence academics
Moroccan imams
Moroccan scholars
Moroccan Sufi writers
20th-century Muslim scholars of Islam
People from Tangier
Banu Idris
Sunni fiqh scholars
Sunni Muslim scholars of Islam
Sunni imams
1902 births
1961 deaths
20th-century Moroccan people